Richard Oscar Linke (October 23, 1917 – June 15, 2016) was an American film producer. He produced over 200 episodes between 1960 and 1986. Linke was Andy Griffith's personal manager for nearly forty years.

Biography
Linke was born in Queens, New York, on October 24, 1917. He died at his home in Hawaii of natural causes on June 15, 2016. He graduated from Ohio University in Athens with bachelor's degree in journalism, and then worked for the Associated Press in New York City starting in 1941. He later went into public relations. In his later years he returned to Athens and taught at Ohio University for about a decade before moving to Hawaii.

References

External links
 

1917 births
2016 deaths
Burials in Hawaii
American film producers
People from Queens, New York